Broderick Shepherd (born 9 December 1992) is an Australian professional wrestler, best known by the ring name Australian Suicide who is currently working for Lucha Libre AAA Worldwide (AAA), where he is the former AAA World Cruiserweight Champion. Before arriving in Mexico, Shepherd competed in other independent companies in both Australia and the United States under the name Ryan Rollins.

Professional wrestling career

Independent circuit (2005–2013) 
Shepherd began fighting in various promotions under the name as Ryan Rollins during his early years in both Australia and other companies such as National Wrestling Alliance (NWA), Melbourne City Wrestling, Slam Factory Wrestling and among other promotions.

In 2012, he was trained by Lance Storm while competing in Canada before he arrived on Lucha Libre AAA Worldwide in Mexico in 2013.

Lucha Libre AAA Worldwide (2013–present) 
On 22 September 2013, Rollins debuted in the largest promotion wrestling Lucha Libre AAA Worldwide (AAA) as the luchador enmascarado (masked wrestler) as Australian Suicide teaming up with Angélico and Jack Evans defeating Eterno, Pentagon Jr. and Steve Pain. On 16 March 2014, at Rey de Reyes, Suicide competed for AAA Cruiserweight Championship where he lost to Daga in a four-way elimination match who was involved with Argenis and Super Fly. At Triplemanía XXII, Suicide was part of a ten-way elimination match to unify the AAA Fusión and AAA Cruiserweight Championships. At the end of 2015, Suicide had a feud against Daga during all AAA events, including in Triplemanía XXIV where Suicide won the Copa Triplemania against his rival and being attacked by the Daga himself after finishing the match. On October 3 at Héroes Inmortales X, Suicide was defeated by Daga in a Lucha de Apuestas, hair vs mask match, where he was forced to take off his mask and reveal his name, Broderick Shepherd from Melbourne, Australia. During the period of time after losing his mask, Suicide began to modify his character as a gang. On 4 June 2017 at Verano de Escándalo, Suicide teamed up with Bengala for the AAA World Tag Team Championship where La Secta (Cuervo and Scoria) was crowned. On 26 January 2018 at Guerra de Titanes, Suicide won the AAA World Cruiserweight Championship defeating Lanzeloth for the first time in his career. At Triplemanía XXVI pre-show, Suicide lost his title to Sammy Guevara in a four-way match, and which also involved A. C. H. and Shane Strickland.

On 3 August at Triplemanía XXVII, Suicide teamed up with Vanilla Vargas for the AAA World Mixed Tag Team Championship against Sammy Guevara and Scarlett Bordeaux, Niño Hamburguesa and Big Mami and Lady Maravilla and Villano III Jr., where they were crowned as new champions.

All Elite Wrestling (2021) 
On 12 January 2021, Suicide made his debut in American promotion wrestling All Elite Wrestling as El Australiano teaming with KC Navarro losing against The Dark Order (Alex Reynolds and John Silver).

Personal life 
Shepherd is in a relationship with fellow professional wrestler Jenyvalice Vargas Torres better known by the ring name Vanilla Vargas.

On 7 July 2020, Shepherd and she announced on her Twitter, that they were expecting their first child together.

Championships and accomplishments
Lucha Libre AAA Worldwide
AAA World Cruiserweight Championship (1 time)
Copa Triplemanía XXIV (2016)

Luchas de Apuestas record

References

External links

1992 births
Living people
Sportspeople from Melbourne
Sportsmen from Victoria (Australia)
Australian male professional wrestlers
Expatriate professional wrestlers in Mexico
Australian expatriate sportspeople in Mexico
Masked wrestlers
AAA World Cruiserweight Champions